Mercedes Vernetta (born 30 March 1957) is a Spanish gymnast. She competed in five events at the 1976 Summer Olympics.

References

1957 births
Living people
Spanish female artistic gymnasts
Olympic gymnasts of Spain
Gymnasts at the 1976 Summer Olympics
Sportspeople from Las Palmas
20th-century Spanish women